Wade Hampton Moore (June 14, 1876 – June 14, 1956) was an American football and baseball player and coach.

Moore was a graduate of the University of Kansas, lettering for the baseball team in 1898 and 1899, and the football team in 1899. Following his college playing career, Moore became the sixth head football coach for the Kansas State Wildcats in Manhattan, Kansas. He held that position for one season, in 1901, and his overall coaching record at Kansas State was 3 wins, 4 losses, and 1 tie. Moore also played in some of his team's games in 1901, kicking two field goals in a win over Bethany College.

After coaching football at Kansas State, Moore turned to playing and coaching minor league baseball From 1902 to 1907 he served as catcher and manager for a series of teams in Texas—in Paris, San Antonio, Houston and Galveston. In 1903, Moore served as player-manager-owner for the San Antonio Bronchos (also known as "Moore's Mustangs"), and led the team to the league championship. After the season ended, Moore sold the team and moved to the Houston Buffaloes. Moore then led the Buffaloes to a league championship in 1905. He was so popular in Houston that the team became known as "Wade's Wanderers" or "Moore's Marvel's".

Moore subsequently moved to Anadarko, Oklahoma, where he operated a movie theater and a company that manufactured baseball bats.

Head coaching record

College football

References

1876 births
1956 deaths
Baseball catchers
Houston Buffaloes managers
Houston Buffaloes players
Galveston Sand Crabs players
Kansas Jayhawks football players
Kansas Jayhawks baseball players
Kansas State Wildcats football coaches
Kansas State Wildcats football players
Minor league baseball executives
San Antonio Bronchos players
People from Anadarko, Oklahoma
People from Franklin County, Kansas